Samia may refer to:

People
 Samia (name)
 Samiya (disambiguation)
 Samia tribe, a Luhya tribe in western Kenya and southeastern Uganda
 Samia (musician)

Places
 North Samia and South Samia, two administrative locations in Funyula division of Busia County in Western Kenya
 Samia, Iran, a village in Bushehr Province, Iran
 Samia, Niger, a town near Zinder

Other uses
 Samia (moth), a Saturniinae moth genus
 Samia (play), a play by Menander
 Samia, a film produced by Humbert Balsan